The Swasthiya Vihar metro station is located on the Blue Line of the Delhi Metro. 
There's no parking facility by the metro station authority but passengers have the option to park their vehicles in the parking lot of the V3S mall, which is right next to the metro station.

Like most of the other metro stations, there are four entry/exit gates here. Public amenities at Swasthiya Vihar metro station includes a Sulabh Complex (paid service). There are a number of outlets like Buddy's in the metro station premises. A couple of them are at the concourse level and one is at the entrance of gate number 2, which is near the entrance of V3S mall.

Near the metro station, besides the V3S mall, there is PSK (Coffee Home), Scope Minar and several commercial office buildings. There's the famous Veer Savarkar Marg, also known as Mini Nehru Place,  a technology hub. Moreover, there are showrooms of big clothing and jewelry brands. Just below the metro station is the Nirman Vihar Bus Stand, from where passengers can board buses for I.T.O, Khureji, Jheel, Pandav Nagar and other areas which are not connected to Delhi Metro.

Station layout

Facilities
List of available ATM at Swasthiya Vihar metro station

Connections

See also
List of Delhi Metro stations
Transport in Delhi
Delhi Metro Rail Corporation
Delhi Suburban Railway

References

External links

 Delhi Metro Rail Corporation Ltd. (Official site) 
 Delhi Metro Annual Reports
 

Delhi Metro stations
Railway stations opened in 2010
Railway stations in East Delhi district